Andrew Saxton (born March 11, 1964) is a Canadian politician and businessman, who was elected Member of Parliament to represent the electoral district of North Vancouver in the 2008 Canadian federal election and re-elected in 2011; he was defeated in 2015 and again in 2019. He is a member of the Conservative Party.

Life and career
Saxton was born in North Vancouver, British Columbia, to a Hungarian immigrant father who came to Canada in 1947, becoming a successful businessman.

Saxton attended Upper Canada College where he graduated with an honours high school diploma in 1982. In his last year at UCC, he served as head of Wedd's House and a member of the UCC Board of Stewards. He went on to attend the University of Western Ontario where he graduated in 1986 with a B.A. in Administrative and Commercial Studies (ACS - Finance), now known as a Bachelor of Management and Organizational Studies (BMOS - Finance). He began his career in finance with Credit Suisse in Switzerland. He later took a position with Credit Suisse in New York City where he was promoted to the position of Assistant Treasurer, and thereafter returned to Vancouver with the same firm. In 1994, he moved to Hong Kong as Senior Account Manager with HSBC and in 1997 he was appointed Senior Vice-President of HSBC Private Banking in Singapore.

Immediately prior to being elected Member of Parliament, Saxton served as chief executive officer of King George Financial Corporation, a real-estate investment firm; director of Canaco Resources Inc., a mineral exploration company; director of the Heart & Stroke Foundation of BC and Yukon; and member of the BC Premier's Asia Pacific Trade Council. Saxton has also served on the Vancouver City Planning Commission, the YVR Aeronautical Noise Management Committee and was founder and past-President of the Pacific Club.

After being elected MP in 2008, Saxton was named parliamentary secretary to the President of the Treasury Board. After being re-elected MP in 2011, he was reappointed as Parliamentary Secretary to the President of the Treasury Board, and was given the added responsibility of Parliamentary Secretary to the Minister for Western Economic Diversification. In September 2013, he was appointed Parliamentary Secretary to the Minister of Finance, Jim Flaherty. He has served on the Standing Committee on Public Accounts, the Joint Standing Committee on Scrutiny of Regulations and the Finance Committee. He served as vice-chair of the Canada-China Legislative Association, co-chair of the Canada-Philippines Interparliamentary Group, chair of the Canada-Hong Kong, Canada-Malaysia, Canada-Brunei Parliamentary Friendship Groups and vice-chair of Canada-Thailand and Canada-Vietnam Parliamentary Friendship Groups. In 2017, he ran unsuccessfully to become leader of the Conservative Party of Canada.

In 2012, Saxton received the Queen Elizabeth II Diamond Jubilee Medal in recognition of his service to his community. In 2016, he received the Order of Merit from the Republic of Hungary for his distinguished service in promoting stronger relations between Canada and Hungary.

Today, Saxton is CEO of King George Financial Corporation, President of Saxton Capital Corporation, and President of Upper Island Development Ltd.

Electoral record

References

 https://web.archive.org/web/20120326093905/http://www.alumnigazette.ca/issues/springsummer-2011/14-alumni-elected-as-mps-in.html

External links
Andrew Saxton

1964 births
Canadian people of Hungarian descent
Conservative Party of Canada MPs
Living people
Members of the House of Commons of Canada from British Columbia
People from North Vancouver
Upper Canada College alumni
HSBC people
University of Western Ontario alumni
21st-century Canadian politicians